Busalla is a comune (municipality) in the Metropolitan City of Genoa in the Italian region Liguria, located about  north of Genoa.

Its territory is crossed by the upper valley of the Scrivia river. Nearby is the artificial Lake Busalletta.

History
The first known mention of Busalla is in an 1192 document. Later it is known to have been held by the Spinola family, who here built a castle. This was sacked several times in the following century, in the course of the Wars of Guelphs and Ghibellines.

In the 16th century the structure, again in ruins, was used as foundation of a new palace for the Spinola. Busalla became part of the Republic of Genoa in 1728. In 1815, together with the latter, it was acquired by the Kingdom of Sardinia.

See also
 Parco naturale regionale dell'Antola

References

External links
 Official website

Cities and towns in Liguria